At least two ships of the French Navy have been named Bison:

 , a  launched in 1928 and sunk in 1940.
 , a  launched in 1939 as Le Flibustier and renamed Bison in 1941. Seized by Italy in 1942 and renamed FR35. Subsequently seized by Germany and sunk in 1944.

French Navy ship names